Koliq (in Albanian) is a village  northeast of Pristina, Kosovo. It is in the Gollak region, which with other villages make up the District of Pristina. It has a population of approximately 50–60 people. As of today, more than 95% of the population have migrated to Pristina for a better economic life. The village is mainly in the mountains, though some parts are on flatlands.

Notes

References 

Villages in Pristina